Northern Star is the debut solo album released by English singer Melanie C, released on 18 October 1999 by Virgin Records. Chisholm and her team recruited several producers to work with her, including William Orbit, Rick Nowels, Marius de Vries, and Craig Armstrong, as well as Rick Rubin. Chisholm co-wrote every song on Northern Stars track listing.

The album's sound is diverse, combining pop music with elements of rock, dance, electronica, trance, techno-rock and R&B which contrasted with the sound of the Spice Girls. AllMusic describes "Northern Star" as a "genre-hopping" album. Commercially, the album peaked at number one on the Swedish Albums Chart and entered the top ten in several countries including Denmark, Finland, Germany, Ireland, the Netherland, and Norway. In the United Kingdom, Northern Star reached number four on the UK Albums Chart and went on to sell almost 900,000 copies. With worldwide sales close to 2.5 million copies, it is the biggest-selling solo Spice Girl album. The album was re-issued on 21 August 2000 to feature the single mixes of "Never Be the Same Again" and "I Turn to You", after the success of both singles.

Background and recording
Chisholm's first solo effort was a duet with Bryan Adams, released as a single on 30 November 1998. "When You’re Gone", originally featured on Adams' album On a Day Like Today, secured a top 3 place on the UK Singles Chart. The single spent 15 weeks in the UK top 40, with nine of these in the top 10. Bryan Adams first met Chisholm in September 1996 at London, while she was performing "Say You'll Be There" with the Spice Girls on Top of the Pops. They both liked each other and Adams always had in mind a possible collaboration with her. They met again in a hotel in the Summer of 1998 when Chisholm was on tour with the Spice Girls; Adams was filming a video, and asked her to sing on his album. She had not heard "When You're Gone" but said she would do it. The success of the single gave Chisholm aspirations for more solo projects. They went on to write three more songs for Chisholm's upcoming debut solo album: "Follow Me", "Angel on My Shoulder" and "You Taught Me", the first two serving as B-sides to the "Northern Star" and "Goin' Down" singles, while "You Taught Me" was released only as a promo to the media.

In early 1999, the Spice Girls took some time off, after extensively touring around the world. Mel B and Victoria Beckham announced they were both pregnant at the time, so every plan for the Spice Girls was put on hold. In January 1999 Chisholm decided to leave the UK and head to Los Angeles in order to work on her solo album, to be released in autumn of the same year. Chisholm was planning to work with producer Rick Rubin, whom she had met a year earlier when the Spice Girls were supposed to record a track with Blackstreet for the South Park album, before legal wrangles intervened. Rubin was to be at the helm for that track, and when he heard of Chisholm's own songwriting ambitions, he offered a hand. Rubin was also Red Hot Chili Peppers' main producer, whose lead singer, Anthony Kiedis was rumoured to be dating Chisholm at the time. Chisholm wanted to do an indie rock album, naming Blur, Oasis, Suede and the Cardigans as her inspiration. She was also very fond of Madonna's work–Ray of Light in particular–and wanted to cut her first album with help from Madonna. According to her interview in July 1999 to the British edition of Cosmopolitan magazine, Madonna invited her to spend some time with her, and she succeeded in having William Orbit, producer of Madonna's Ray of Light, on opening track "Go!" as a writer and producer, while Marius de Vries, Craig Armstrong and Rick Nowels, who also worked with Madonna on Ray of Light, also contributed tracks for Chisholm's solo project. Four months after Chisholm left for Los Angeles, Virgin Records executives, worried about the way the media would feel about her solo album, were given an early promo CD, named "Northern Star – Work in Progress CD", to give them a premiere on her sound as a solo artist. The last tracks recorded for the album were "Go!" and "I Turn to You", both not included on the early promotional CD.

Release and promotion
Northern Star was released in the UK and Europe on 18 October 1999 and later in the United States and Canada on 2 November 1999. To promote the album, Chisholm made a number of televised appearances and live performances of the album's songs. Her first gig as a solo artist took place at Leadmill Club in Sheffield, on 19 August 1999, in front of a crowd of 900 people. Chisholm also performed at the V99 rock festival on 21 and 22 August, receiving mixed to negative reviews, with BBC noting its confusion about which direction Chisholm wanted to take as a solo artist, and whether she wanted to be a pop star, a rock star or a punk star. A special documentary entitled Northern Star was aired on Channel 4 on 30 August, focusing on her life in Los Angeles during the recording of her first solo album. "Closer",  "Something's Gonna Happen", "I Wonder What It Would Be Like", "Independence Day", "Northern Star" and "Why" made their debut during the documentary, and the music video of "Goin' Down" was also shown. She embarked on her first solo tour, From Liverpool to Leicester Square in the Autumn of 1999, and later the Northern Star Tour, which started in Warsaw, Poland on 31 August 2000, and finished in Bonn, Germany on 26 August 2001.

On 23 April 2022, a limited vinyl pressing was released as part of Record Store Day. 2,500 copies were made available, marking the first time the album was released on vinyl. This version of the album featured the track "Follow Me", and the bonus tracks from the 2000 re-release. This release had 3 playable sides to the vinyl, and a fourth that included an etching of the back cover art. The album reached number 32 on the UK Official Vinyl Albums Chart.

Chart performance
Northern Star debuted at number 10 on the UK Albums Chart, in the issue dated 24 October 1999. Album sales increased in the UK when "Never Be the Same Again" released as a single, entering the top 10 again and moving to number five two weeks later. Northern Star kept selling steadily well during the following months, until "I Turn to You" was released in August 2000, when sales took off again and Northern Star achieved its peak position on 2 September 2000, hitting number four of the album chart, nearly a year after its release. As of October 2016, Northern Star had spent 79 weeks on the official UK Albums Chart. Its last appearance on it was in January 2004, nearly 4 and a half years after its release. It has sold over 890,000 copies in the UK, as of October 2016. In the United States, it failed to chart in its first week of release. The album sold 6,717 copies in its first week, missing the bottom of the chart by a few hundred. In Canada, it charted at number 15.

Singles
"Goin' Down" was released as Chisholm's debut single in the third quarter of 1999 and reached the top ten in the United Kingdom, where it became her first top-five hit as a solo artist. It also reached the top thirty in Australia.

The second single "Northern Star" was released as the second single in the winter of 1999 and received positive reception from music critics. The single charted at number four on the UK Singles Chart, becoming her third top-five single. It additionally reached the top 20 in Finland, Italy, and Sweden. In the United Kingdom, the single sold over 200,000 copies.

"Never Be the Same Again" was released on 20 March 2000 as the third single from her first solo album. The single entered at the top of the UK Singles Chart, beating Moloko's "The Time Is Now" to the summit and it was Melanie C's first solo single to reach number one. It sold 144,936 copies in its first week and was Britain's eighteenth best-selling song of 2000. The song was successful in other markets, topping the charts in seven countries and receiving positive acclaim. By April 2021, the song had sold more than 477,000 copies in UK.

The fourth single from the album "I Turn to You" was released on 7 August 2000 in the United Kingdom and became Melanie's second UK number-one single. It sold 120,000 copies in its first week, altogether selling 360,477 copies, making it the twenty-seventh best-seller of 2000 in the UK. "I Turn to You" also topped the Austrian Singles Chart, the Danish Singles Chart, the Dutch Top 40, the Swedish Singles Chart and the US Billboard Hot Dance Club Play chart. The main single was released as the "Hex Hector Radio Mix", for which Hex Hector won the 2001 Grammy as Remixer of the Year.

Selected as the album's fifth and final single "If That Were Me" was released in November 2000. The song peaked in the UK Singles Chart at number eighteen, becoming the first of her solo singles to not reach the top five. The proceeds from its sale went to the Kandu Arts charity.

Track listing
Credits adapted from the liner notes of Northern Star.

Charts

Weekly charts

Year-end charts

Certifications and sales

References

External links
 Official site

1999 debut albums
Melanie C albums
Virgin Records albums
Albums produced by Rick Rubin
Albums produced by William Orbit
Albums produced by Marius de Vries
Albums produced by Rick Nowels
Albums recorded at Olympic Sound Studios